Bullen's African Lion Safari Park was the name of several open-range safari parks in Australia:

 African Lion Safari (Warragamba), New South Wales, opened by Stafford Bullen

 Wanneroo Lion Park, originally named Bullen's African Lion Safari Park, in Carabooda, Western Australia

See also
 Bullen's Animal World, Wallacia, New South Wales